James Arthur Prescott, CBE, FRS, (7 October 1890 – 6 February 1987) was an agricultural scientist.

Prescott was born in England, educated at the University of Manchester achieving Bachelor of Science with First Class Honours in 1911. The following year he was awarded the first postgraduate scholarship in agricultural science taken at Rothamsted Experimental Station at Harpenden.

From 1916 to 1924, Prescott worked for Sultanic Agricultural Society of Egypt. There he produced 13 scientific papers, including four on the study of nitrogen in the soil, and alkalinity of Egyptian soils. In 1919 he was awarded a Master of Science by the University of Manchester based on a thesis of his phosphate studies while at Rothamsted.

From 1924 until his death Prescott worked in Australia, initially as Chair of Agricultural Chemistry at the University of Adelaide. He published in CSIR bulletin 52 'The Soils of Australia in Relation to Vegetation and Climate' at a scale of 1:19 x 10*6. This paper was the basis of his submission to the University of Adelaide for which he was awarded the degree of Doctor of Science in 1932.

Prescott produced 'Atmospheric Saturation Deficit in Australia' in 1931 and with H.G. Poole, 'The relationships between Sticky Point, Moisture Equivalent and Mechanical Analysis in some Australian Soils' in 1934. Prescott was Chairman of the CSIR Oenological Research Committee 1938–1955 and a member of the Council of the Australian Wine Research Institute 1955–1970. In 1954 he became a Foundation fellow of the Australian Academy of Science.

Honours
1931 H. G. Smith Memorial Award of the Royal Australian Chemical Institute
1938 Joseph Verco Medal of the Royal Society of South Australia
1947 Commander of the Order of the British Empire
1948 John Lewis Medal of the South Australian Branch of the Royal Geographical Society
1948 Farrer Medal of the Farrer Memorial Trust of New South Wales
1950 Australian Medal of Agricultural Science of the Australian Institute of Agricultural Science
1954 Mueller Medal of the Australian and New Zealand Association for the Advancement of Science
1956 Honorary Degree of Doctor of Agricultural Science, University of Melbourne
The Australian Society of Soil Science established the J.A. Prescott Medal in 1971 to be awarded for outstanding contributions to soil science and climatology.

References

1890 births
1987 deaths
Australian agronomists
Australian soil scientists
British soil scientists
Australian people of English descent
Fellows of the Royal Society
Fellows of the Australian Academy of Science
Commanders of the Order of the British Empire
People educated at Accrington Grammar School
Academic staff of the University of Adelaide
Farrer Medal recipients
20th-century agronomists